Psychotria ligustrifolia, the Bahama wild coffee, is a species of plant in the family Rubiaceae. It is native to Florida, Puerto Rico, and the Bahamas.

Synonyms
 Psychotria bahamensis

See also
Bahamian dry forests

References

 Atlas of Florida Vascular Plants
 Derek Burch, Richard P. Wunderlin and Daniel B. Ward, "Contributions to the Flora of Florida: 9, Psychotria (Rubiaceae)", Castanea, Vol. 40, No. 4 (Dec., 1975), pp. 273–279.

ligustrifolia
Flora of the Bahamas
Flora of Florida
Flora of Puerto Rico
Vulnerable plants